Rhysida polyacantha is a species of centipede in the Scolopendridae family. It is endemic to Australia, and was first described in 1985 by L. E. Koch.

Distribution
The species occurs in the Northern Territory, Queensland and Western Australia.

Behaviour
The centipedes are solitary terrestrial predators that inhabit plant litter, soil and rotting wood.

References

 

 
polyacantha
Centipedes of Australia
Endemic fauna of Australia
Fauna of New South Wales
Fauna of Queensland
Fauna of Western Australia
Animals described in 1985